The following is a list of notable deaths in August 1999.

Entries for each day are listed alphabetically by surname. A typical entry lists information in the following sequence:
 Name, age, country of citizenship at birth, subsequent country of citizenship (if applicable), reason for notability, cause of death (if known), and reference.

August 1999

1
Rudy Burckhardt, 85, Swiss-American filmmaker and photographer, suicide by drowning.
Nirad C. Chaudhuri, 101, Indian English-language writer.
Tommy Hinnershitz, 87, American race car driver.
Kalyan Kumar, 71, Indian film actor and producer.
Naseer Malik, 49, Pakistani cricket player.
Paris Pişmiş, 88, Armenian-Mexican astronomer.
İrfan Özaydınlı, 75, Turkish soldier and politician.

2
Alberto Gironella, 69, Mexican painter.
Gregorio Cárdenas Hernández, Mexican serial killer.
Sunthorn Kongsompong, 68, Thai military commander and politician, Prime Minister (1991-1992), lung cancer.
Alf Miller, 82, English football player and coach.
Willie Morris, 64, American writer and editor.
Bernhard Quandt, 96, German politician.
Jim Slaughter, 71, American basketball player.
Peter Vanneck, 77, British Royal Navy officer, fighter pilot and politician.

3
Abd al-Wahhab Al-Bayati, 72, Iraqi poet.
Rodney Ansell, 44, Australian cattle grazier, buffalo hunter and inspiration for Crocodile Dundee, killed in a police shootout.
Byron Farwell, 78, American military historian, biographer, and politician.
Myung Jae-nam, 61, Korean Hapkido practitioner, stomach cancer.
Dick Latvala, 56, American musician and tape archivist for rock band the Grateful Dead.
Bob Mollohan, 89, American politician.
Yitzhak Rafael, 85, Israeli politician.
Leroy Vinnegar, 71, American jazz bassist, heart attack.
Roy Wiggins, 73, American steel guitarist.

4
Akhlaq Ahmed, 49, Pakistani playback singer, blood cancer.
Liselott Linsenhoff, 71, German equestrian and Olympic champion.
Victor Mature, 86, American film actor (One Million B.C., Samson and Delilah, Kiss of Death), leukemia.
Lucrecia Reyes-Urtula, 70, Filipina choreographer, theater director and author.
Derrick Shepard, 35, American gridiron football player, heart attack.
Carl Toms, 72, British set and costume designer, emphysema.

5
James Failla, 80, American mobster (Gambino crime family).
Henry Holloway, 68, Australian rugby player and coach.
John Kacere, 79, American visual artist.
David Munro, 55, English documentary filmmaker, cancer.
Rimma Zhukova, 74, Soviet and Russian speed skater.

6
Mihai Băcescu, 91, Romanian zoologist.
Ilse Pausin, 80, Austrian pair skater and Olympic medalist.
Kalpnath Rai, 58, Indian politician, heart attack.
Rita Sakellariou, 64, Greek singer, cancer.
Muhammad Shariff, 78, Pakistani Army general.
Claudette Sorel, 66, American pianist and educator, cancer.
Jerry Yulsman, 75, American novelist and a photographer, lung cancer.

7
Wally Albright, 73, American former child actor.
Jonathan Boyd, 54, Australian professional wrestler, heart attack.
Herbert Hagen, 85, German SS-Sturmbannführer and war criminal during World War II.
Brion James, 54, American actor (Blade Runner, The Fifth Element, 48 Hrs.), heart attack.
J. Andrew Keith, 40, American role-playing game designer.
Harry Litwack, 91, American college basketball coach.
Desmond Marquette, 90, American film editor.
Kazuo Miyagawa, 91, Japanese cinematographer.
Tsou Tang, 80, Chinese-American political scientist.
John Van Ryn, 94, American tennis player.

8
Virginia Allan, 82, American educator and women's employment advocate.
Yolanda Sofia Vargas Pereira Dulché, 73, Mexican writer.
Paavo Rintala, 68, Finnish novelist and theologian.
Dora Schaul, 85, German resistance activist during World War II.
Harry Walker, 82, American baseball player, manager and coach.

9
Ira Baldwin, 103, American academic and administrator.
John Hallett, 81, Australian politician.
Cliff Hanley, 76, Scottish journalist, novelist, playwright and broadcaster .
William Arthur Irwin, 101, Canadian journalist and diplomat, asthma.
Georg Marischka, 77, Austrian actor, screen writer, and film producer.
John O'Neill, 56, Australian rugby player, cancer.
Helen Rollason, 43, British sports journalist and television presenter, colorectal cancer.
Jackie Sato, 41, professional wrestler from Yokohama, Japan, stomach cancer.
Riley Smith, 88, American football player.
Roger Stott, 56, Britishpolitician, liver cancer.
Abraham H. Taub, 88, American mathematician and physicist.
Yury Volyntsev, 67, Soviet and Russian film and theater actor.

10
Ernesto Melo Antunes, 65, Portuguese military officer.
Ernst Bader, 85, German actor, composer and songwriter (lyricist).
Giuseppe Delfino, 77, Italian fencer and Olympic champion.
Lenko Grčić, 74, Croatian football player and coach.
Jens Hoyer Hansen, 59, Danish-born New Zealand jeweller, cancer.
Jennifer Paterson, 71, British chef and television personality (Two Fat Ladies), lung cancer.
Anthony Stanislas Radziwill, 40, American television executive and filmmaker, cancer.
Kari Suomalainen, 78, Finnish political cartoonist.
Baldev Upadhyaya, 99, Indian literary historian, essayist and critic.

11
Dickie Davis, 77, English footballer.
Robert Dorfmann, 87, French film producer.
James Otto Earhart, 56, American murderer, execution by lethal injection.
Robert Thomas Jones, 89, American engineer.
Ernst Kaether, 95, German Wehrmacht general during World War II.
Luz Machado, 83, Venezuelan political activist, journalist and poet.
Ramnath Parkar, 52, Indian cricket player.
Mimi Pollak, 96, Swedish actress and theatre director.
Byron Randall, 80, American West Coast artist, emphysema.
Tommy Ridgley, 73, American R&B singer and bandleader, lung cancer.
Henk Chin A Sen, 65, Surinamese politician.
A. G. Ram Singh, 89, Indian first-class cricket player.

12
Pavel Arsyonov, 63, Soviet and Russian film actor, screenwriter and film director.
Jean Drapeau, 83, Canadian lawyer and politician.
Ross Elliott, 82, American television and film character actor, cancer.
Albert E. Green, 86, British applied mathematician and research scientist.
John Rigby Hale, 75, British historian.
Wilfrid Kalaugher, 94, New Zealand athlete and scholar.
Georges Roux, 84, French writer and historian.
Bob Wilson, 83, American politician.
Martin Wong, 53, Chinese-American painter, AIDS related illness.
Can Yücel, 72, Turkish poet, throat cancer.

13
Susana Ferrari Billinghurst, 85, Argentine aviator.
Ignatz Bubis, 72, German Jewish leader.
Jaime Garzon Forero., 38, Colombian comedian, journalist, politician, and peace activist, murdered.
John Geering, 58, British cartoonist.
Frederick Hart, 55, American sculptor, cancer.
Nathaniel Kleitman, 104, American physiologist and sleep researcher.
Maria Krüger, 94, Polish children’s literature writer and journalist.
Argentina Díaz Lozano, 86, Honduran journalist and novelist.
Sulo Nurmela, 91, Finnish cross-country skier and Olympic champion.
Herberto Sales, 81, Brazilian journalist and writer.

14
Evelyn Adams, 75, American baseball player (AAGPBL).
Lane Kirkland, 77, American labor union leader, cancer.
Philip Klutznick, 92, American administrator, Secretary of Commerce (19080-1981), Alzheimer's disease.
Pat Mullin, 81, American baseball player.
John Pingel, 82, American football player.
Pee Wee Reese, 81, American baseball player (Boston Red Sox) and member of the MLB Hall of Fame, lung cancer.
Lidia Selkregg, Italian geologist.

15
Patricia Beer, 79, English poet and critic.
Hugh Casson, 89, English architect, interior designer, artist and writer.
Frank Castle, 75, English sprint athlete and rugby player.
Paddy Devlin, 74, Irish social democrat, labour and civil rights activist.
Greek George, 86, Catcher in Major League Baseball.
Mark McPhee, 35, Australian cricketer, traffic accident.
Olga Orozco, 79, Argentine poet, cardiovascular disease.
Celestine Sibley, 85, American newspaper reporter.

16
Anton Alberts, 72, Dutch architect.
David W. Allen, 54, American film and television stop motion animator, cancer.
Ron Aspinall, 80, English cricket player.
Roy Edwards, 62, Canadian ice hockey player.
Nancy Guild, 73, American film actress, emphysema.
Regina Kent, 31, Hong Kong actress, brain cancer.
Rose Leon, 85, Jamaican businesswoman and politician, homicide.
Hédard Robichaud, 87, Canadian politician.
Rudolf Sremec, 89, Yugoslav and Croatian film director.

17
Randy Heflin, 80, American baseball player.
Charles Samuel Joelson, 83, American lawyer and politician.
Reiner Klimke, 63, German equestrian and Olympic champion, heart attack.
Henri Paret, 69, French racing cyclist.
Bill Tyquin, 80, Australian rugby player.

18
Alfred Bickel, 81, Swiss football player and coach.
Albert Frazier, 84, American football and baseball coach.
Alf Kirchen, 85, English football player.
Hanoch Levin, 55, Israeli dramatist, author and poet, heart attack.

19
Irene Falcón, 91, Spanish journalist, feminist and activist, respiratory condition.
Dee Fondy, 74, American baseball player.
Ian Orr-Ewing, Baron Orr-Ewing, 87, British politician.
Kim Perrot, 32, American basketball player, lung cancer.
Rodrigo Riera, 75, Venezuelan guitarist and composer.
Shaukat Hussain Rizvi, 85, Pakistani actor, film producer and director.

20
Arthur Cain, 78, British evolutionary biologist and ecologist.
Bob Gallion, 75, American country music singer.
Josef Herink, 83, Czech physician and mycologist.
Bobby Sheehan, 31, American musician and songwriter, accidental overdose.
Josane Sigart, 90, Belgian tennis player.
Abdus Salam Talukder, 62, Bangladeshi politician and lawyer.

21
Leo Castelli, 91, Italian-American art dealer.
Faisal bin Fahd, 54/55, Saudi prince, heart attack.
Cilly Feindt, 90, German circus performer and stage and film actress.
Jimmy Roe, 90, American soccer player.
Hans von Herwarth, 95, German diplomat.
Yevgeni Yeliseyev, 90, Soviet and Russian football player and coach.

22
Aleksandr Demyanenko, 62, Russian film and theater actor, heart attack.
Yann Goulet, 85, French sculptor.
Marguerite Muni, 70, French actress.
Hide Hyodo Shimizu, 91, Japanese-Canadian educator and activist.

23
Martha Rountree, 87, American pioneering broadcast journalist.
Ray F. Smith, 80, American agronomist and entomologist.
Frank Tredrea, 79, New Zealand racing cyclist.
Norman Wexler, 73, American screenwriter (Saturday Night Fever, Serpico, Raw Deal), heart attack.
James White, 71, Northern Irish author of science fiction short stories and novels, stroke.

24
Georges Boulogne, 82, French football player and manager.
Roberto Bussinello, 71, Italian racing driver.
Warren Covington, 78, American big band trombonist.
Mary Jane Croft, 83, American actress (The Adventures of Ozzie & Harriet, I Love Lucy, Our Miss Brooks).
Jo Gullett, 84, Australian soldier, politician, diplomat and journalist.
Alexandre Lagoya, 70, French classical guitarist.
William Kaye Lamb, 95, Canadian historian, archivist and librarian.

25
Rob Fisher, 42, British songwriter and musician (Naked Eyes, Climie Fisher), colorectal cancer.
Dave Holmes, 75, American football player and coach, heart attack.
George Petty-Fitzmaurice, 8th Marquess of Lansdowne, 86, British peer and politician.
George Sugarman, 87, American painter and sculptor.
Georg Thomalla, 84, German actor.
Jack Whent, 79, English soccer player.

26
Louise Bellocq, 90, French writer, poet, and woman of letters.
Tonči Gulin, 61, Croatian football player.
Elena Murgoci, 39, Romanian long-distance runner and Olympian, stabbed.
Raymond Vernon, 85, American economist, cancer.

27
Elizabeth Blackbourn, English table tennis player.
Harold Jack Bloom, 75, American television producer and screenwriter, cancer.
Hélder Câmara, 90, Brazilian Roman Catholic archbishop, heart attack.
Nyoshul Khenpo Jamyang Dorje, 67, Tibetan lama.
Bai Guang, 78, Chinese actress and singer, colon cancer.
Enzo Martinelli, 87, Italian mathematician.
Louise Thompson Patterson, 97, American social activist and college professor.
Ralph Riley, 74, British geneticist.

28
Rafael Manzanares Aguilar, 81, Honduran folklorist, author, and musical composer.
Stephen Akinmurele, 21, British suspected serial killer, suicide.
Harvie M. Conn, 66, Canadian missionary.
Johnny Gerlach, 82, American Major League Baseball player.
Dave Pope, 78, American baseball player.

29
Ann Baker, 84, American jazz singer.
Jaime Fields, 29, American gridiron football player, hit-and-run car accident.
Paul Horiuchi, 93, American painter and collagist, Alzheimer's disease.
Claudio Lezcano, 69, Paraguayan football player.
Willy Rathnov, 62, Danish film actor, neck cancer.
Emeline Hill Richardson, 89, American classical archaeologist and Etruscan scholar.
Luca Sportelli, 72, Italian actor.

30
Abdullah Al-Baradouni, 70, Yemeni writer, poet and critic.
Reindert Brasser, 86, Dutch athlete and Olympian.
Hans Heinrich Eggebrecht, 80, German musicologist and academic.
George Golding, 93, Australian runner and hurdler.
Kristapor Ivanyan, 78, Soviet and Armenian lieutenant general.
William A. Niering, 75, American botanist.
Raymond Poïvet, 89, French cartoonist.
Fritz Shurmur, 67, American football coach, liver cancer.
Edward Stewart, 84, American set decorator (All That Jazz, The Wiz, Network), Oscar winner (1980).
István Timár-Geng, 76, Hungarian basketball player.

31
Marguerite Chapman, 81, American actress.
Ed Kea, 51, Canadian ice hockey player, drowned.
Sylvia Potts, 55, New Zealand middle-distance athlete and Olympian, cancer.
Henry Earl Singleton, 82, American electrical engineer and business executive.

References 

1999-08
 08